The Itombwe owl (Tyto prigoginei) is a species of owl in the barn owl family, Tytonidae. It is restricted to a small area in the Albertine Rift montane forests.

Taxonomy and systematics
The Itombwe owl was first described by the Belgium naturalist Henri Schouteden in 1952 and given the binomial name Phodilus prigoginei, being placed in the genus Phodilus along with the two Asian bay owls, being referred to as the Congo bay owl or African bay owl. The specific epithet was chosen in honour of the Russian-born mineralogist and ornithologist Alexandre Prigogine who had first brought the owl to Schouteden's attention. The owl is not well known and has been treated as a race of the Oriental bay owl, but this is now considered unlikely, and, in fact, the two species do not appear to be closely related. Even so, its inclusion in Phodilus is rather dubious, and genetic research is required. It is possible that this species may instead be placed in the genus Tyto or even a separate monotypic genus. In 2023, this species was classified into Tyto by the International Ornithological Congress on the basis of morphological similarities.

Description
The Itombwe owl is a small owl with chestnut brown on the upper-parts, black and white spots on the crown and nape, and reddish cream underparts. The only specimens known have been adult females, males and juveniles are therefore unknown. It is similar to the other Phodilus species in being smaller than typical barn owls, and having the more U-shaped facial disk; however, the ear-like feather tufts are hardly visible. While it does show some similarities to the Oriental bay owl in its plumage colour and pattern, its facial disc is heart shaped like that of the western barn owl, and the similarity with the oriental bay owl may be due to convergence.

Voice
In 1990, some long mournful whistles made by an unidentified owl were tape-recorded in Nyungwe Forest in Rwanda and were thought to be those of the Congo bay owl.

Distribution and habitat
The type specimen was collected at Muusi, at an altitude of 2,430m, in the Itombwe Mountains in the eastern Democratic Republic of Congo in 1951. It was then unconfirmed until a second individual was captured in a mist net in 1996 in the south east corner of the Itombwe Mountains, some 95 km south of, and 600m, lower than the collection site of the type specimen. In addition there was the recording in Rwanda mentioned above and a possible sighting in Burundi in 1974.

Both of the specimens captured were taken in similar habitat of montane forest interspersed with areas of grassland and stands of bamboo.

Conservation
The biology of the Itombwe owl is almost completely unknown as is its population size or even its complete geographic range. Conservation efforts cannot start without this research. It is threatened by the clearing of its habitat for small scale agriculture as well as by logging, mining, wildfires and forest clearance. The Itombwe Forest has recently been proposed as a community reserve, but its boundaries still require defining.

References

Further reading

External links
BirdLife Species Factsheet

Congo bay owl
Birds of Central Africa
Congo bay owl
Congo bay owl
Congo bay owl
Taxonomy articles created by Polbot